Inside Out was the brand name for a number of regional television programmes in England broadcast on BBC One. Each series, made by a BBC region, focuses on stories from the local area. Commissioned by BBC One controller Lorraine Heggessey, the programme began on 9 September 2002 and replaced a number of different titles previously used on BBC Two.

The programme ended on 30 March 2020 and was replaced in 2022 by a new programme, We Are England, which has fewer regional editions and focusses on one subject per edition with regional takes on the chosen subject.

Versions
 Inside Out London – Presented by Sean Fletcher
 Inside Out South East – Presented by Natalie Graham
 Inside Out South – Presented by Jon Cuthill
 Inside Out South West – Presented by Jemma Woodman
 Inside Out West – Presented by Alastair McKee
 Inside Out West Midlands – Presented by Ayo Akinwolere
 Inside Out North West – Presented by Jacey Normand
 Inside Out North East & Cumbria – Presented by Chris Jackson
 Inside Out Yorkshire & Lincolnshire – Presented by Keeley Donovan (September 2017–present)
 Inside Out East Midlands – Presented by Lukwesa Burak.
 Inside Out East – Presented by David Whiteley
 Inside Out Channel Islands – began early 2012
 Inside Out England – Presented by Lukwesa Burak

Inside Out England shows selected stories from the regional programmes and is shown across England which is hosted by Matthew Wright. But this was relaunched in 2016 as Inside Out as a weekly round up on the BBC News channel with Lukwesa Burak now presenting.

Controversy
A programme was filmed in December 2009 and only shown in February 2010. A debate followed as to whether the BBC should have told the police before the programme aired. The BBC was also accused of promoting assisted suicide.

In January 2013, the writer and presenter Chris Geiger investigated a self-styled spiritual healer who claimed to be able to treat cancer using a special diet. Chris Geiger, a cancer survivor himself, used a hidden camera and posed as a client; again this programme provoked widespread debate.

See also

 BBC Scotland Investigates (1993)

Notes
 A different region is selected each week for broadcast on the BBC News Channel.

References

External links
 

2002 British television series debuts
2020 British television series endings
2010s British television series
2020s British television series
BBC television documentaries
British television news shows
English-language television shows
Current affairs shows